The Armstrong Whitworth A.W.35 Scimitar was a British single-engine biplane fighter aircraft designed and built by Armstrong Whitworth Aircraft. Four Scimitars were produced for the Norwegian Army Air Service and were delivered in 1936.

Design and development
The A.W.35 Scimitar was a development of Armstrong Whitworth's earlier Armstrong Whitworth A.W.16 fighter, powered by an Armstrong Siddeley Panther engine, with a lowered nose decking and an enlarged fin and rudder. The first prototype (G-ACCD) was a modification of the second A.W.16, and first flew in this form on 29 April 1935. A second prototype (G-ADBL) was constructed by converting another A.W.16.

Operational history
Four Scimitars were ordered for the Norwegian Army Air Service, and an agreement signed for licence production at the Norwegian Army Aircraft Factory at Kjeller. After testing by the A & AEE at Martlesham Heath in late 1935, the four Scimitars were delivered to Norway in 1936. The licence agreement was cancelled later that year when it was found that the aircraft was unsuitable for operation on skis without further design changes. The Scimitars remained in use in the training role at the outbreak of the Second World War. When the Germans invaded in 1940 the Scimitars were all undergoing maintenance and could not be made operational in time to see combat.

The second prototype Scimitar was preserved by Armstrong Whitworth at its Whitley factory until 1958, when it was scrapped.

Operators

 Norwegian Army Air Service

Specifications (A.W.35)

See also

References

1930s British fighter aircraft
Scimitar
Biplanes
Single-engined tractor aircraft
Aircraft first flown in 1935